PP-234 Vehari-VI is a Constituency of Provincial Assembly of Punjab.

General elections 2013
Muhammad Naeem Akhtar Khan Bhabha is now elected MPA of PP-237 & He is Independent Candidate

General elections 2008
Naeem Khan Bhabha MPA in 2008 from PML-N

See also
 PP-233 Vehari-V
 PP-235 Vehari-VII

References

External links
 Election commission Pakistan's official website
 Awazoday.com check result
 Official Website of Government of Punjab

Provincial constituencies of Punjab, Pakistan